Cătălin Ionuț Cîrjan (born 1 December 2002) is a Romanian footballer who plays as a midfielder for Premier League club Arsenal.

Career

As a youth player, Cîrjan joined the youth academy of Romanian third tier side Viitorul Domneşti. In 2019, he joined the youth academy of Arsenal in the English Premier League. His development at Arsenal was hampered by serious knee injuries that put him out of action for over a year. There was a 480 day gap between an appearance in a friendly against Boreham Wood and his return in an under-21 match for Arsenal in August 2022. By September 2022 he was training with the first team Arsenal squad. In May 2022, he signed a new professional contract with Arsenal.

References

External links
 

2002 births
Association football midfielders
Expatriate footballers in England
Living people
Romania youth international footballers
Romanian expatriate footballers
Romanian expatriate sportspeople in England
Romanian footballers
Arsenal F.C. players